"Flames" is a song by French DJ and record producer David Guetta and Australian singer-songwriter Sia. The song was released on 22 March 2018 by What a Music, as the third single from Guetta's seventh studio album, 7 (2018). The duo's seventh collaboration, it was written by Sia, Guetta, Christopher Braide, Giorgio Tuinfort and Marcus van Wattum, with production handled by the latter three.

The single was a commercial success, reaching the top 5 on official charts across Europe, including France, Scotland, Switzerland and the Netherlands. It also reached the top 10 in the United Kingdom and Germany among others, was the most-played song on European radio in 2018, and earned Sia a nomination for Best Female Artist at the ARIA Music Awards of 2018.

Background 
"Flames" became the seventh collaboration between Guetta and Sia, after "Titanium", "She Wolf (Falling to Pieces)", "Wild One Two", "Bang My Head", "The Whisperer" and "Helium". In a press release, Guetta opened up about the pair's history and his excitement at the prospect of getting back in the studio with her:

Composition
"Flames" is an electropop and house song with elements of dance music. A track with vague '80s influences, it is performed in the key of F minor with a tempo of 94 beats per minute in common time. The chorus of the song follows a progression of Cm–E–Fm–D, and Sia's vocals span from B3 to C5.

Music video
A lyric video for "Flames" was released on 22 March 2018. It was directed by Joe Rubinstein.

The official music video for "Flames" was released on 5 April 2018 on Guetta's YouTube channel. This work was directed by Lior Molcho. It emulates 1970s wuxia films and features three women (Lauren Mary Kim, Courtney Chen and Aryn Wu) training with their martial arts master (Danny Trejo). The training includes chopping a block of wood, balancing  wooden buckets, and catching a fly with chopsticks, but suddenly they are ambushed by a group of ninjas, and the master is killed after he surrendered upon request by a checkmate disciple. The three are then captured and taken to the palace, where they encounter the ruler (Guetta). Then the three break free and fight all the ninjas, but the ruler defeats them by throwing fireballs. The master then reappears in ghostly form, and encourages them to fight back. Eventually, the three defeat the ruler by forcing his fire-casting hands down to his crotch hence burning him to the ground in a rather fatal way, ending with the master watching his disciples' appearance almost happily.

Reception
The song was well received by music critics. Roisin O'Connor of The Independent said: "The track is classic Sia, starring her incredible voice and a big, emotive chorus; it's an uplifting, low-key banger that shows off the maturity Sia has brought to previous Guetta tracks, along with his talent for an infectious beat." Dean Chalkley of edm.com said: "Once again, Guetta showcases his skills in providing a massive pop-house hybrid ready to take over the radio stations all over the world, offering a perfect foundation to Sia's distinctly powerful and unique voice. With a bit slower tempo, a new pop ballad is just what one could expect from the duo." Mike Nied from Idolator called it "an inspiring anthem complete with a rousing production and another of the 'Chandelier' siren's jaw-dropping vocal lines." Brittany Spanos of Rolling Stone described the song as "uplifting": "On the song, Guetta goes for a less clubby sound than usual. The song is more earnest as Sia offers words of encouragement to a loved one weathering a tough time."

At the ARIA Music Awards of 2018, "Flames" earned Sia a nomination for Best Female Artist.

Track listing

Digital download
"Flames" – 3:15

Digital download – Acoustic
"Flames" (Acoustic) – 3:52

Digital download – Remixes
"Flames" (Robin Schulz Remix) – 3:28
"Flames" (Leandro Da Silva Remix) – 5:45

Digital download – Remixes EP
"Flames" (David Guetta Remix) – 6:08
"Flames" (Tepr Remix) – 3:52
"Flames" (Pink Panda Remix) – 3:48
"Flames" (Sylvain Armand Remix) – 4:32
"Flames" (Vladimir Cauchemar Remix) – 3:24
"Flames" (Extended) – 4:51

Digital download – Remixes 2 EP
"Flames" (Aazar Remix) – 2:52
"Flames" (Two Can Remix) – 2:28
"Flames" (Tom Martin Remix) – 3:27
"Flames" (Igor Blaska Remix) – 4:58

Digital download – Remixes
"Flames" (Extended) – 4:51
"Flames" (David Guetta Remix) – 6:08
"Flames" (Leandro Da Silva Remix) – 5:45
"Flames" (Pink Panda Remix) – 3:48
"Flames" (Tepr Remix) – 3:52
"Flames" (Robin Schulz Remix) – 3:28
"Flames" (Two Can Remix) – 2:28
"Flames" (Aazar Remix) – 2:52
"Flames" (Sylvain Armand Remix) – 4:32
"Flames" (Igor Blaska Remix) – 4:58
"Flames" (Vladimir Cauchemar Remix) – 3:24
"Flames" (Tom Martin Remix) – 3:27
"Flames" (Instrumental) – 3:15

Charts

Weekly charts

Year-end charts

Certifications

Release history

References

2018 singles
2018 songs
David Guetta songs
Sia (musician) songs
Songs written by David Guetta
Songs written by Sia (musician)
Songs written by Giorgio Tuinfort
Songs written by Chris Braide
Number-one singles in the Czech Republic
Number-one singles in Hungary
Number-one singles in Norway
Number-one singles in Poland
Number-one singles in Russia
Song recordings produced by David Guetta